Protection is any measure taken to guard a thing against damage caused by outside forces. Protection can be provided to physical objects, including organisms, to systems, and to intangible things like civil and political rights. Although the mechanisms for providing protection vary widely, the basic meaning of the term remains the same. This is illustrated by an explanation found in a manual on electrical wiring:

Some kind of protection is a characteristic of all life, as living things have evolved at least some protective mechanisms to counter damaging environmental phenomena, such as ultraviolet light. Biological membranes such as bark on trees and skin on animals offer protection from various threats, with skin playing a key role in protecting organisms against pathogens and excessive water loss. Additional structures like scales and hair offer further protection from the elements and from predators, with some animals having features such as spines or camouflage serving exclusively as anti-predator adaptations. Many animals supplement the protection afforded by their physiology by burrowing or otherwise adopting habitats or behaviors that insulate them from potential sources of harm. Humans originally began wearing clothing and building shelters in prehistoric times for protection from the elements. Both humans and animals are also often concerned with the protection of others, with adult animals being particularly inclined to seek to protect their young from elements of nature and from predators.

In the human sphere of activity, the concept of protection has been extended to nonliving objects, including technological systems such as computers, and to intangible things such as intellectual property, beliefs, and economic systems. Humans seek to protect locations of historical and cultural significance through historic preservation efforts, and are also concerned with protecting the environment from damage caused by human activity, and with protecting the Earth as a whole from potentially harmful objects from space.

Physical protection

Protection of objects
Fire protection, including passive fire protection measures such as physical firewalls and fireproofing, and active fire protection measures, such as fire sprinkler systems. 
Waterproofing, though application of surface layers that repel water.
Rot-proofing and rustproofing
Thermal conductivity resistance
Impact resistance
Radiation protection, protection of people and the environment from radiation
Dust resistance
Conservation and restoration of immovable cultural property, including a large number of techniques to preserve sites of historical or archaeological value

Protection of persons
Close protection, physical protection and security from danger of very important persons
Climbing protection, safety measures in climbing
Diplomatic protection
Humanitarian protection, the protection of civilians, in conflict zones and other humanitarian crises
Journalism source protection
Personal protective equipment
Safe sex practices to afford sexual protection against pregnancy and disease, particularly the use of condoms
Executive protection, security measures taken to ensure the safety of important persons
Protection racket, a criminal scheme involving exchanging money from "protection" against violence
Right of asylum, protection for those seeking asylum from persecution by political groups and to ensure safe passage
Workplace or employment retaliation, protecting individuals in the workplace such as from being fired for opposing, aiding and complaining about workplace practices

Protection of systems

Protection of technological systems
Protection of technological systems is often symbolized by the use of a padlock icon, such as "🔒", or a padlock image.
Protection mechanism, in computer science. In computer sciences the separation of protection and security is a design choice. William Wulf has identified protection as a mechanism and security as a policy.
Power-system protection, in power engineering
A way of encapsulation in object-oriented programming

Protection of ecological systems
Environmental protection, the practice of protecting the natural environment

Protection of social systems
Consumer protection, laws governing sales and credit practices involving the public.
Protectionism, an economic policy of protecting a country's market from competitors.
Protection of rights, with respect to civil and political rights.
Data protection through information privacy measures.
Intellectual property protection.

See also
Safety
Security

References

Safety